Yazevka-Sibirskaya is a rural locality (a station) in Kashinsky Selsoviet, Aleysky District, Altai Krai, Russia. The population was 59 as of 2013. There are 4 streets.

References 

Rural localities in Aleysky District